Andrew William Carr (born 28 February 1956) is an English former footballer who played as a defender for Port Vale, Northwich Victoria, Nantwich Town, Leek Town, Macclesfield Town and Droylsden.

Career
Carr graduated through the Port Vale junior side to sign professional forms in November 1973. His only first team appearance for the "Valiants" came at right-back on 9 January 1974 in an FA Cup third round replay at Kenilworth Road, which was lost 4–2 to Luton Town. He was handed a free transfer away from Vale Park by manager Roy Sproson in May 1975, and moved into the local non-league football. 

He was signed by Northwich Victoria on a free transfer in May 1975 and moved on to Nantwich Town in November 1975, where he was a key member of the 1976 Cheshire Senior Cup winning squad. He commanded a £400 fee when he signed for Leek Town in December 1977. He left Harrison Park for Macclesfield Town, where he made his debut in October 1978. He was back with Nantwich later that season but followed boss Colin Hutchinson to Droylsden in December 1979.  Carr returned again to Nantwich in December 1980, leaving in the summer of 1981, only to feature yet again for the Dabbers at the end of the decade.

Career statistics
Source:

Honours
Nantwich Town
Cheshire Senior Cup: 1976

References

Footballers from Stoke-on-Trent
English footballers
Association football defenders
Port Vale F.C. players
Northwich Victoria F.C. players
Nantwich Town F.C. players
Leek Town F.C. players
Macclesfield Town F.C. players
Droylsden F.C. players
English Football League players
Northern Premier League players
1956 births
Living people